Peter Stewart Macliver (1822 – 19 April 1891) was a Scottish journalist and  Liberal Party politician who sat in the House of Commons from 1880 to 1885.

Macliver was the son of David Macliver of Kilchoman, Islay. He was educated at Glasgow High School, and Glasgow University. He became a journalist and co-founded the Western Daily Press in Bristol in 1858. He was a J.P. for Somerset.

At the 1880 general election, Macliver was elected as a Member of Parliament (MP) for Plymouth.
He held the seat until his defeat at the 1885 election.

Macliver died at the age of 68 .

MacLiver married Anne Miller daughter of P Miller of Glasgow in 1842. He was a cousin of Field Marshal Baron Clyde.

References

External links

1822 births
1891 deaths
Liberal Party (UK) MPs for English constituencies
UK MPs 1880–1885
Alumni of the University of Glasgow
Scottish journalists
People educated at the High School of Glasgow
19th-century British journalists
British male journalists
Members of the Parliament of the United Kingdom for Plymouth